Little Union may refer to:

 The Day of the Unification of the Romanian Principalities, a holiday commemorating this event, sometimes known as the Little Union Day
 Little Union, Missouri, unincorporated community in Marion County in Missouri, in the United States
 The Little Union River, a river in the United States